Love U Zindagi - Geet Ke Funde is an Indian television series which premiered on 29 January 2011 on STAR Plus. The series is based on the story of Rahul, a broken hearted scion of an industrialist family and Geet, a young, bold and bubbly girl. The story is set in a Punjabi backdrop, and is loosely based on the Shahid Kapoor and Kareena Kapoor starrer Jab We Met.

About the show
The show is the about the romance of two individuals who are complete opposites. Rahul is a broken hearted scion of an industrialist family who is escaping from life itself. Geet is a Sikhni from Bhatinda with a zest for life, and who lives for the moment. The young couple meet each other on the Punjab Mail train and begin the memorable journey of their lives first from Bombay, to Bhatinda, then to Manali.

Cast

Main
Sidharth Shukla as Rahul Kashyap
Pavitra Punia as Geet Dhillon

Recurring
Aleeza Khan as Roop Dhillon
Navina Bole as Manjeet
Pavan Malhotra as Daljeet
Neelu Kohli as Parmeet
Surendra Pal as Daarji
Karaan Singh as Kunal Sood
 Shivani Gosain as Vimmi Bua
Sonia Kapoor as Rahul's mother
Ajay Sharma as Harsimran
 Heli Daruwala as Neha
Sakshi Batra as Preeto
Abhidnya Bhave as Samyukta
Shraddha Musale as Joanna
Lorde as  Amanpreet
 Jitendra Trehan as Geet's father
Akhlaque Khan as Nikhil
Priyanka Khandale as Resho

References 

StarPlus original programming
Indian drama television series
2011 Indian television series debuts
2011 Indian television series endings